Ana Gutiérrez (born September 18, 1961) is a long-distance runner who represents the United States Virgin Islands. She competed in the women's marathon at the 1992 Summer Olympics.

References

External links
 

1961 births
Living people
Athletes (track and field) at the 1991 Pan American Games
Athletes (track and field) at the 1992 Summer Olympics
United States Virgin Islands female long-distance runners
United States Virgin Islands female marathon runners
Olympic track and field athletes of the United States Virgin Islands
Place of birth missing (living people)
United States Virgin Islands female cross country runners
Pan American Games competitors for the United States Virgin Islands
21st-century American women